Lutley is an area of Halesowen in the West Midlands, England.  Site of a mill, called the Lutley Mill, also the name of a local Pub. Lutley Mill is situated on Puddings Brook. The Lutley Gutter runs through Lutley.

History

Historically a part of Worcestershire, Lutley was one of the possessions of the Priests of Wolverhampton and the only one of their possessions outside Staffordshire. Unlike most of the rest of Halesowen, Lutley remained in Worcestershire, when the manor of Halesowen was transferred to Shropshire. This also applied to Cradley and Warley Wigorn. The ownership resulted in the manor of Lutley being with Codsall and various other places part of the manor of the Deanery of Wolverhampton.

This became as ribbon development along Hagley Road, but expanded in the 1980s with the development of Portsdown Road and the roads leading off it.

Community facilities
The area contains Lutley Primary School and the Lutley Community Centre.

See also
Dudley Metropolitan Borough
Evolution of Worcestershire county boundaries
History of the West Midlands
History of Worcestershire
Shropshire (Detached)

References

Areas of Dudley
Halesowen
History of Worcestershire